Stadio Marcello Melani is the main stadium in Pistoia, Italy. It is currently used mostly for football matches and is the home ground of U.S. Pistoiese 1921. The stadium holds 13,195.

History
The Stadio Comunale di Pistoia was opened 25 June 1966 with a friendly match between Pistoiese and Vasco de Gama (1-2).

Previously Pistoiese played in the little stadium "Monteoliveto", where about 600 official matches were played.

On 6 December 2006, the Stadio Comunale was dedicated to Marcello Melani, president of Pistoiese from 1974 to 1984. During his presidency Pistoiese earned the club's only promotion to Serie A in its history.

Current status
As of the start of the 2021-2022 season, two stands are in use - the Curva Sud for visiting supporters, and the main (west) stand, which houses home supporters. the Curva Nord and the east side terraced stand are closed.

Gallery

References

External links
Stadio Marcello Melani on Pistoiese's website
Satellite view of Stadio Marcello Melani

Marcello Melani
Marcello
Buildings and structures in Pistoia
Sports venues in Tuscany